IFK Karlskrona are a Swedish handball club based in Karlskrona. The club was founded in 1921. They won Allsvenskan in 1944–1945. They reached the final of the Swedish championship, at the time played as a straight knockout tournament, in 1940, 1944 and 1945, but were beaten each time by Majorna. They won Allsvenskan again in 1948–49, but were eliminated in the first round of the Swedish championship by Näsby IF. In 1952, the Swedish championship tournament was discontinued and the Swedish champions title was awarded to the winners of Allsvenskan. The club finished second in Allsvenskan in 1955–56; their fourth Swedish championship silver. They were relegated from Allsvenkan in 1961 and did not return until 1981. In 1983, Karlskrona reached the final of the IHF Cup, where they were defeated by Soviet club ZTR Zaporizhia. They most recently played in the top division, renamed Elitserien, in 1995. They currently play in Division 2, the fourth level.

Kits

References

Swedish handball clubs
Idrottsföreningen Kamraterna
1921 establishments in Sweden
Handball clubs established in 1921
Sport in Blekinge County